Sam Moore (born 9 September 1998) is a rugby union player who plays Number 8 for the Ospreys.

Club career
Moore joined the Sale Sharks Academy in 2016. In July 2017 he was awarded his first professional contract, a five-year deal starting from the 2017-18 season. In October 2017, Moore made his senior debut for Sale Sharks against Lyon in the European Challenge Cup.

Moore joined the Ospreys during the 2021–2022 season.

International career
Moore is the son of former Wales player Steve Moore and the nephew of Andy Moore, who also played for Wales between 1995 and 2002. As his father was born in England, Moore is eligible to play for them in addition to being eligible to play for Wales where he was born.

Moore has elected to play for England at under-16, under-17, under-18 and under-19 level. Moore represented the England U20 side in the 2018 Six Nations Under 20s Championship. He was ruled out of the 2018 World Rugby Under 20 Championship due to injury. In February 2018, Moore was included in the England senior team squad for the first time.

Under current World Rugby regulations, Moore remains eligible to play for either the England or Wales senior teams.

External links
Sale profile

References

1998 births
Living people
Sale Sharks players
Rugby union number eights
People educated at Merchant Taylors' Boys' School, Crosby
People educated at Sedbergh School
Cardiff Rugby players
Welsh rugby union players
Doncaster Knights players
Ospreys (rugby union) players